Robert Lawrence is an American film producer and former studio executive.

Early life 
Lawrence was born in New York City and grew up in Great Neck, New York.

Lawrence graduated with honors from the University of California at Berkeley and then attended the Graduate Screenwriting Program at UCLA School of Film and Television.

Career 
Lawrence began his film career at Paramount in the story department, and a year later joined the Robert Evans unit as a writer.

In 1980 Lawrence joined Columbia Pictures as a vice-president of Production and was named Executive Vice President of Worldwide Production for Columbia Pictures in March 1985,  where he oversaw production of films such as Ghostbusters, The Karate Kid, Tootsie and Out of Africa.

In 1986 Lawrence joined United Artists as the President of Motion Picture Production. During his time at United Artists, Lawrence oversaw productions of such films as Rain Man, Presumed Innocent and Mrs. Doubtfire. In 1987, he departed from United Artists to set up his own production company with a two-year agreement at the studio, which will be based at the United Artists headquarters in Beverly Hills.

During this time, he screened the Hong Kong action film Legacy of Rage (1986) starring Brandon Lee and saw Lee's potential to be an action leading man in Hollywood. It led to their collaboration which was Lee's first lead in an American Studio film the action thriller Rapid Fire (1992).

Lawrence founded Maysville Pictures along with George Clooney and together produced Rock Star before the two split in 1999. As an independent producer he started his own production company, Robert Lawrence Productions. Lawrence is best known as a producer on movies such as Clueless, Die Hard with a Vengeance and The Last Castle.

Current production
In the Winter of 2016, Variety (magazine) announced that Lin-Manuel Miranda would join Lawrence in producing TV and film adaptations of Patrick Rothfuss’ fantasy trilogy The Kingkiller Chronicle.

Personal life
Lawrence has three sons and currently lives in Pacific Palisades, California.

Filmography
He was a producer in all films unless otherwise noted.

Film

Television

References

External links

1953 births
Living people
American film producers